Deryck Andrew Vincent (born 16 September 1964) is an Irish first-class cricketer who plays for Clontarf Cricket Club.

Vincent's nephews Stuart Poynter and Andrew Poynter also represented Ireland cricket team and his son, David seems to be following his footsteps.

References

External links
 

1964 births
Living people
Cricketers from Dublin (city)
Irish cricketers
Wicket-keepers